Tomáš Pötsch was a Czechoslovak boxer. He competed in the men's lightweight event at the 1928 Summer Olympics.

References

Year of birth missing
Year of death missing
Czechoslovak male boxers
Olympic boxers of Czechoslovakia
Boxers at the 1928 Summer Olympics
Place of birth missing
Lightweight boxers